The 2021–22 Australian region cyclone season, despite a very high number of tropical lows, was a slightly below-average season in terms of activity, with ten tropical cyclones, two of which intensified further into severe tropical cyclones. The season began from 1 November 2021 and ended on 30 April 2022, but a tropical cyclone could form at any time between 1 July 2021 and 30 June 2022 and would count towards the season total. During the season, tropical cyclones will be officially monitored by one of the three tropical cyclone warning centres (TCWCs) for the region which are operated by the Australian Bureau of Meteorology, National Weather Service of Papua New Guinea and the Indonesian Agency for Meteorology, Climatology and Geophysics. The United States Joint Typhoon Warning Center (JTWC) and other national meteorological services including Météo-France and the Fiji Meteorological Service also monitored the basin during the season.


Season summary
 

A tropical low developed to the north of the Western Region on 9 November, starting the season and the overall Southern Hemisphere season as well. After passing near the Cocos Islands with rainfall, it exiting the basin into the South-West Indian Ocean region on 14 November. Three days later, Tropical Low 02U formed near the Christmas Island and later became Tropical Cyclone Paddy, the first named cyclone in this season. On 22 November, Tropical Low 03U formed and it exited the basin on 28 November. On 1 December, Tropical Cyclone Teratai was designated by TCWC Jakarta, but BoM downgraded to a tropical low later that day due to limited deep convection. Ex-Teratai was monitored for redevelopment for a few days, and on 7 December, the system was re-upgraded to tropical storm status. The system later dissipated on 11 December. On 9 December, BoM designated Tropical Low 07U and later became Tropical Cyclone Ruby, which peaked as a Category 2 tropical cyclone before entering the South Pacific basin. About two weeks later, Tropical Low 08U was monitored for development but made landfall before further strengthening could occur. The tropical low later entered the Coral Sea  where Tropical Cyclone Seth peaked with winds of 70 mph. A couple days after Seth dissipated, Tropical Low 10U quickly organized and was named Tiffany. The tropical cyclone rapidly intensified to a Category 1-equivalent tropical cyclone before making landfall over Northern Queensland. Land interaction and wind shear significantly weakened the system. Tiffany later made a second landfall over Northern Territory without restrengthening much over the Gulf of Carpentaria. On 23 January, a tropical low was monitored for a couple days before entering the South-West Indian Ocean, which later became Cyclone Batsirai and caused devastation to Madagascar. On 29 January, BoM started to track Tropical Low 16U and exited the basin without affecting land. Meanwhile, Tropical Low 14U caused record flooding in the Kimberly Region. 

A week later, Tropical Low 17U formed and initially the system had deep convection and a well defined center, but easterly shear and dry air prevented strengthening and was last noted on 14 February. On 13 February, Tropical Low 19U formed southeast of Christmas Island and exited the basin a few days later, which was later designated as Moderate Tropical Storm Fezile. On 23 February, Tropical Low 22U quickly developed deep convection and an inner core, and BoM upgraded the system to Tropical Cyclone Vernon. Afterward, the system underwent rapid intensification and peaked as a Category 4 severe tropical cyclone before interacting with Tropical Low 25U. While Vernon stayed out to sea and entered the South-West Indian Ocean, Tropical Low 21U developed in the Torres Strait, but high wind shear prevented further development. At the same time, Tropical Low 23U was monitored in the Timor Sea and later became Tropical Cyclone Anika before making landfall northeast of Kalumburu. Anika made a second landfall east of Pardoo, and briefly developed a better inner core inland due to the brown ocean effect. Tropical Low 26U was also monitored for development east of Christmas Island and attained tropical storm force winds, but high easterly wind shear caused the system to disintegrate. On 11 March, Tropical Low 27U formed south of Java and quickly developed an inner core before being named Billy and stayed out to sea as the system eventually succumbed to high wind shear. A few days later, Tropical Low 28U formed southwest of Sumba and was later named Charlotte. The tropical cyclone rapidly intensified quicker than expected and peaked as a Category 3-equivalent tropical cyclone while attempting to clear out a pinhole eye. However, the peak was relatively short-lived as the convection got sheared and Charlotte transitioned to an extratropical cyclone. On 30 March, a tropical low formed on Christmas Island and dissipated a couple days later. Another tropical low formed on 8 April, but did not impact any habitable areas. In mid-April, Tropical Low 33U formed in the Gulf of Carpentaria and dissipated a few days later. Tropical Low 34U also formed, but did not impact land. Around its peak, there was an eye-like feature, but northwesterly shear caused the system to become disorganized. 

During the off-season, Tropical Cyclone Karim entered the basin on 7 May and did not pose a threat to land. Another tropical low formed on 28 May, but remained disorganized due to wind shear and brought some rainfall to Western Australia. After the season, the BoM noted that they found a separate circulation that was once considered a part of Tropical Low 34U. It developed on 25 April and tracked away to the east and dissipated the next day.

Systems

Tropical Cyclone Paddy 

During 17 November, the BoM reported that Tropical Low 02U had developed along a trough of low pressure, just to the west of Christmas Island. Over the next couple of days, the system remained slow-moving near the island before it started to move south-eastwards. On 21 November of 04:00 UTC, the JTWC issued a Tropical Cyclone Formation Alert (TCFA) for Invest 90S which the agency was tracking very recently, noting that the system was well-structured, with convection and near gale-force winds wrapping into its consolidated low-level circulation center. The BoM did not upgrade the system into a tropical cyclone at that time, as its centre was still somewhat elongated, and the near gale-force winds were only present at its southern quadrant. At 00:00 UTC of 22 November, the BoM upgraded the system to a Category 1 tropical cyclone on the Australian scale, and named it Paddy, becoming the first named cyclone in the season. The JTWC followed suit later that day at 09:00 UTC.

Paddy then reacted quickly to increasing northwesterly shear, as its convection began to decrease at 12:00 UTC that same day, and by early next day, the BoM reported that Paddy had become an ex-tropical cyclone. As it turned to the south-southwest as the ridge to its south strengthened further, the synoptic gradient between the two increased, letting the storm reintensify slightly that same day, though gale-force winds were not wrapping halfway of the system. The winds would later rapidly decrease, and by 24 November, the BoM discontinued monitoring Paddy. The JTWC subsequently followed suit and issued its final warning on the storm. 

Paddy remained far from major landmasses throughout its existence; however, it brought prolonged rainfall to Christmas Island. During a five-day period from 17 to 21 November, the island saw  of rain.

Tropical Low 03U

On 22 November, a weak tropical low formed north of the Western Region, which was designated as 03U.

Tropical Cyclone Teratai 

On 28 November, the BoM reported that a low formed within a monsoon trough to the southwest of Sumatra. They designated it as 05U by the next day. At 23:30 UTC on 30 November, the JTWC issued a TCFA for the system as the agencies found that the convection in associated with the system had increased. By the next day, the BoM briefly upgraded it to a Category 1 tropical cyclone on the Australian scale, and named it Teratai which was given by TCWC Jakarta. Later, the JTWC upgraded Teratai to a tropical storm, as it briefly attained sufficient convection.  But at 18:00 UTC, the BoM downgraded to a tropical low as deep convection had become limited, with the LLCC displaced towards the south. This was caused due to the lack of sufficient outflow caused by the northerly strait line flow which inhibited the system from further intensifying, despite favorable conditions. The JTWC followed suit two hours later. During the next few days, the BoM monitored ex-Teratai for redevelopment as the system executed a clockwise loop. By 6 December, the JTWC issued a TCFA, and the next day it re-upgraded the system to a tropical storm. However, by 09:00 UTC of 9 December, JTWC issued its final warning. The BoM continued to track the system until 11 December.

Tropical Cyclone Ruby 

On 6 December, the BoM predicted that a tropical low could form near the Solomon Sea. Two days later, the tropical low formed, and the BoM designated it as 07U. The JTWC later issued a TCFA. The system's deep convection became more organized overnight in 10 December, and began to strengthen, with gale-force winds being reported on 11 December. Late on the same day, the JTWC upgraded the system into a tropical storm. By the next day, it was upgraded to a  Category 1 tropical cyclone on the Australian scale, and the BoM named it as Ruby. Twelve hours later, the BoM upgraded Ruby into a Category 2 cyclone, with the JTWC following suit and upgraded the system into a category 1-equivalent tropical cyclone. By 13 December, Ruby reached its peak intensity, before subsequently crossing into the South Pacific basin.

Tropical Low 06U

On 7 December, the BoM noted on a possibility of a weak tropical low developing over the northern part of the Arafura Sea. The BoM designated the system as 06U. By 13 December, the BoM stated that 06U was already forming. The system was last noted on 15 December.

Tropical Cyclone Seth 

On 21 December, the BoM started to monitor a possible tropical low near the Arafura Sea. Two days later, the BoM designated the low as 08U. The JTWC started to monitor the system on 24 December. By that same day, BoM began issuing advisories on the system, predicting a Category 1 intensity before landfall, while the JTWC issued a TCFA at 21:00 UTC on the same day. However, the TCFA was cancelled at 18:00 UTC on 25 December, since the system moved inland, and the BoM ceased issuing advisories as well. However, the tropical low kept moving eastward, reaching the Gulf of Carpentaria, before moving over the Top End and entering the Coral Sea. At 02:30 UTC on 30 December, the JTWC issued a TCFA again on the system; however, at 02:30 UTC on 31 December, the TCFA was cancelled, due to the system developing subtropical characteristics. Around that same time, the BoM upgraded the low to a Category 1 tropical cyclone on the Australian scale and named it Seth. At 15:00 UTC, the JTWC finally classified it as a tropical cyclone, designating the system with the identifier 04P.  The cyclone reached its peak intensity that day, with BoM estimating Seth as a category 2 tropical cyclone, with sustained winds of 110 km/h (70 mph), before subsequently downgrading the storm to a category 1 tropical cyclone at 18:00 UTC that same day. At 06:00 UTC on 1 January, the BoM reclassified Seth as an ex-tropical cyclone. The JTWC issued their final warning three hours later. On the next day, the BoM classified the system as a subtropical low. 

As a post-tropical cyclone, Seth killed 2 people; one in Queensland and the other in New South Wales.

Tropical Cyclone Tiffany 

On 4 January, the BoM started to monitor a possible tropical low near the Coral Sea. By 8 January, BoM began issuing advisories on Tropical Low 10U. The JTWC later issued a TCFA on the system. By the next day, the BoM upgraded it to a category 1 tropical cyclone, and named it Tiffany. The JTWC subsequently followed suit and started issuing advisories on Tiffany. Tiffany then rapidly intensified, peaking as a Category 2 tropical cyclone in the Australian scale and a Category 1-equivalent tropical cyclone in the Saffir-Simpson scale. The storm then rapidly weakened and made landfall over the Cape York Peninsula as a category 1 tropical cyclone at 06:00 UTC on 10 January. Due to land interaction, it rapidly weakened overland and became a weak tropical low. The low entered into the Gulf of Carpentaria with that intensity by the same night. Despite the moderate wind shear, Tiffany re-intensified, with the BoM upgrading the system into a category 2 tropical cyclone by 11 January. On 00:00 UTC of 12 January, the storm made its final landfall over the Northern Territory region and was followed by rapid weakening. The JTWC stopped issuing advisories by the same time. 

Tiffany brought gusty winds and heavy rainfall exceeding  to the Top End. A house near Katherine suffered around A$50,000 (US$36,000) in damage from fallen trees.

Tropical Low 11U

On 6 January, the BoM first noted the possible formation of a weak tropical low. By 13 January, 11U formed while moving west-southwestward, it dissipated by the next day.

Tropical Low 16U 

On 29 January, the BoM started tracking a tropical low. They designated it as 16U. By the next day, the JTWC started to monitor the low and gave it a low chance of formation into a tropical cyclone. Under a favorable environment of warm sea surface temperatures, lowering wind shear and good outflow aloft, the system continued to consolidate, prompting the JTWC to issue a TCFA by 31 January. Late on the same day, the JTWC upgraded it to a tropical cyclone and designated it as 09P. However, 16U did not intensify further as a dry air entrainment hampered the system's intensification, while continuing to move east-southeast under a near-equatorial ridge positioned to the north and northeast. The JTWC later downgraded 16U into a tropical depression. On 3 February, 16U exited the basin and entered the South Pacific basin.

Tropical Low 14U 

In Western Australia, prolific rains affected the Kimberly Region with some areas recording accumulations not seen in over a century. Country Downs measured  by 2 February, including  in a 24-hour span. The latter constituted the second-highest daily rainfall on record in the state. Flooding occurred along the Fitzroy River, covering roads, washing out topsoil, knocking down fences, and toppling trees. More than 80,000 lightning strikes were observed around Broome. Rainfall in the city reached  on 30 January, surpassing the total rainfall seeing during the entirety of 2021.

Tropical Low 17U

Tropical Low 19U (Fezile)

Tropical Low 20U

Severe Tropical Cyclone Vernon 

On 23 February, the BoM reported that a tropical low had developed to the southwest of Christmas Island in the Indian Ocean, and designated it as 22U. By the next day, the JTWC started to monitor the low, and gave it a low chance of formation into a tropical cyclone. Under a favorable environment of warm sea surface temperatures, low wind shear, and increasing poleward outflow, the system organized further, prompting the JTWC to issue a TCFA at 14:00 UTC that same day. At 00:00 UTC on 25 February, the low intensified into a category 1 tropical cyclone in the Australian scale, with the BoM naming it as Vernon. The JTWC subsequently started to issue advisories. Moving west-southwest along the northern periphery of a deep-layered subtropical ridge to the south, Vernon went on a rapid intensification phase over the day, with BoM and JTWC upgrading Vernon into a category 3 severe tropical cyclone in the Australian scale and a category 1-equivalent tropical cyclone in the Saffir-Simpson scale respectively 12 hours later, as it developed a pinhole eye. Vernon then intensified to a category 4 severe tropical cyclone by the next day, as it started to move out of the basin and into the South-West Indian Ocean basin.

Tropical Low 21U

Tropical Cyclone Anika 

During 23 February, the BoM started to monitor an enhanced area of convection, that developed along a monsoon trough in the Timor Sea. The JTWC started to track the area late on the same day, and gave a low chance of formation into a tropical cyclone. By the next day, the convection organized into a tropical low, and the BoM designated it as 23U. Under a favorable environment of warm sea surface temperatures and pronounced outflow being offset by high wind shear, the low continued to organize, with the JTWC issuing a TCFA late on 24 February. At 15:00 UTC the next day, the low intensified into a category 1 tropical cyclone, with the BoM naming it as Anika. The JTWC subsequently followed suit and upgraded the system into a tropical storm, noting deep and cold convection covering its low-level circulation center. By 25 January, Anika intensified to a category 2 cyclone, before making landfall in the Kimberley coast, to the east of Kalumburu at 12:00 UTC that same day. As a result, the BoM downgraded Anika to an ex-tropical cyclone. The JTWC subsequently issued their final advisory on the system. Anika then moved southeastwards, emerging to the Indian Ocean on 1 March. During this time, the system initially struggled to redevelop, as its mid-level circulation center was displaced significantly to the south. The JTWC issued a TCFA on Anika that same day, before upgrading the system back into a tropical storm, as banding was wrapping to its center. The BoM then re-upgraded Anika to a category 1 tropical cyclone at 06:00 UTC the next day, before briefly reintensifying to a category 2 tropical cyclone as it made its second landfall near Wallal. The JTWC subsequently discontinued issuing advisories on Anika once again. It weakened into a category 1 tropical cyclone as it moved further inland, before becoming a tropical low on 3 March. It dissipated by the next day.

Anika caused trees to fall in Kimberley, and more than 260 mm of precipitation was recorded according to the BoM.

Tropical Low 25U

On 26 February, Tropical Depression 08 briefly moved into the western portion of the basin while undergoing a fujiwhara interaction with Severe Tropical Cyclone Vernon, and was designated by BoM as Tropical Low 25U. 25U was last noted on 27 February where it moved back to the South-West Indian Ocean basin.

Tropical Low 26U

Tropical Cyclone Billy 

A tropical low formed to the southeast of Christmas Island on 12 March and tracked steadily to the west-southwest. The low improved during 13 March and reached tropical cyclone intensity at 00:00 UTC 14 March. Billy reached a peak at category 2 intensity that night well to the south of Cocos Island. The cyclone weakened rapidly on 16 March, although gales continued in southern quadrants through to 17 March as the system tracked to the south.

Severe Tropical Cyclone Charlotte 

A tropical low formed over the northern Timor Sea on 16 March and tracked westwards. During 19 March the low started intensifying while moving southwest over open waters in between Indonesia and Western Australia. The system was named tropical cyclone Charlotte during Monday morning 21 March. The next 24 hours was quite significant where Charlotte rapidly intensified from a category 1 to a category 4 cyclone on 22 March. Charlotte maintained this intensity for at least 12 hours as it tracked south-westwards under the influence of a subtropical ridge.

The cyclone began weakening during 23 March due to drier air intrusion and increasing north-westerly wind shear. The system was downgraded to a tropical low at 18:00 UTC 24 March as it moved south over cooler waters off Western Australia. It dissipated on 26 March.

There was no direct impact from Severe Tropical Cyclone Charlotte to the Australian mainland or island communities. Earlier in its life cycle, it caused heavy rain over the Timor-Leste but there were no reports of any damages.

Severe Tropical Cyclone Charlotte was the eighth tropical cyclone in the Australian region for the 2021/22 season.

Tropical Low 30U

The Bureau of Meteorology reported that a tropical low formed on Christmas Island on 30 March. It was designated as 30U. The cyclone lost its tropical characteristics on 1 April and was downgraded to a low pressure common on the high seas.

Tropical Low 32U

According to a bulletin released by the Bureau of Meteorology on the morning of 8 April, a new tropical low formed in Papua New Guinea. It was designated as 32U. It lost its tropical characteristics on 9 April without affecting any habitable areas.

Tropical Low 33U 

On 16 April, The BoM tracked a tropical low near the Top End and the Gulf of Carpentaria. It was designated as 33U. 33U slowly headed towards Cape York Peninsula. The BoM issued its final warning on the storm on 19 April.

Tropical Low 37U

On 24 April, the BoM had noted that they found a separate circulation that was once considered a part of Tropical Low 34U. It was classified as 37U. It started to track to the east. It peaked at 996 mbar with 10-min winds of 45 mph. The next day, the low started to weaken and was dissipated on 27 April.

Tropical Low 34U 

A tropical low formed  from Christmas Island, according to the Bureau Of Meteorology technical bulletin, and was designated 34U. The cyclone intensified and the agency released unusual bulletins about the possibility of reaching Category 1, even though it did not pose a threat to any habitable areas.  The system was upgraded to a tropical storm in post-analysis.

Tropical Cyclone Karim 

The BoM detected a tropical low near Cocos Island on 6 May, and it was designated as 36U. The JTWC reported in its first unofficial technical bulletin that the low pressure system was present in very warm waters (30 to 31 °C) and moved south-southwest a day after it formed. On 7 May at 14:00 UTC, Karim entered the Australian region and BoM initiated advisories on the system as a Category 1 tropical cyclone on the Australian scale. On the morning of 9 May, the storm reached Category 2 unexpectedly, as the agency's forecasts, until then, did not indicate a more explicit intensification. It dissipated on 11 May. Cyclone Karim was the strongest cyclone to exist entirely out of season since Cyclone Rhonda in 1997.

Tropical Low

A tropical low was formed out of season, according to the Bureau Of Meteorology. The disturbance was located near Christmas Island and was first noted on 28 May. The JTWC classified the disturbance as subtropical in an unofficial bulletin and called it Invest 92S the next day. On 30 May, the agency issued a short bulletin warning that the cyclone could directly hit the region of Pilbara in the west of the country.

Other systems 
The Australian Bureau of Meteorology first noted the formation of a possible low-pressure system to the southwest of the island of Sumatra by 4 November. It then entered the region by the next day while tracking slowly towards the island. Environmental conditions were analyzed to be unfavorable for further development and as such, the BoM only forecast a "very low" chance of the low becoming a tropical cyclone. The tropical low then passed to the south of the archipelago before turning westwards and exiting the basin into the South-West Indian Ocean region by 14 November.

On 22 January, a weak tropical low formed north of the Timor Sea. It was moving east before it changed to west. The system was last noted on 25 January.

On 23 January, the BoM reported that a tropical low had formed in the northwestern portion of the basin. The system moved in a westward direction until it was last tracked on 25 January, when it had exited the basin and moved into the South-West Indian Ocean. At its peak intensity in the Australian region, the BoM estimated the system's minimum atmospheric pressure as 1003 hPa. The MFR began tracking the system, with the system intensifying into Moderate Tropical Storm Batsirai on 27 January.

Storm names

Bureau of Meteorology
The Australian Bureau of Meteorology (TCWC Melbourne) monitors all tropical cyclones that form within the Australian region, including any within the areas of responsibility of TCWC Jakarta or TCWC Port Moresby. Should a tropical low reach tropical cyclone strength within the BoM's area of responsibility, it will be assigned the next name from the following naming list. The names that was used for 2021–22 season is listed below:

TCWC Jakarta
TCWC Jakarta monitors Tropical Cyclones from the Equator to 11S and from 90E to 145E. Should a Tropical Depression reach Tropical Cyclone strength within TCWC Jakarta's Area of Responsibility then it will be assigned the next name from the following list. The name that was used for 2021–22 season is listed below:

TCWC Port Moresby
Tropical cyclones that develop north of 11°S between 151°E and 160°E are assigned names by the Tropical Cyclone Warning Centre in Port Moresby, Papua New Guinea. Tropical cyclone formation in this area is rare, with no cyclones being named in it since 2007. As names are assigned in a random order, the whole list is shown below:

Tropical cyclones from other basins
If a tropical cyclone enters the Australian basin from the Southwest Indian region basin (east of 90°E), it will retain the name assigned to it by the Météo-France (MFR). The following storms were named in this manner:

 Karim

Retirement

Later in 2022, the Bureau of Meteorology retired the name Seth, replacing it with Stafford due to the damage caused by it in Queensland.

Season effects

See also

Weather of 2021 and 2022
List of Southern Hemisphere cyclone seasons
List of off-season Australian region tropical cyclones
Tropical cyclones in 2021, 2022
Atlantic hurricane seasons: 2021, 2022
Pacific hurricane seasons: 2021, 2022
Pacific typhoon seasons: 2021, 2022
North Indian Ocean cyclone seasons: 2021, 2022
2021–22 South-West Indian Ocean cyclone season
2021–22 South Pacific cyclone season

References

External links

 Australian Bureau of Meteorology
 Joint Typhoon Warning Center
 Tropical Cyclone Warning Center Jakarta 
 Papua New Guinea National Weather Service

Australian region cyclone seasons
2021 meteorology
2022 meteorology